Kevin Stephens is a footballer.

Kevin Stephens may also refer to:

Kevin Stephens (American football) in 2012 Southern Utah Thunderbirds football team
Kevin Stephens (athlete) in 1992 Central American and Caribbean Junior Championships in Athletics

See also
Kevin Stevens (disambiguation)